Mai Po Marshes (Hong Kong Hakka: Mi3bu4 Sip5ti4) is a nature reserve located in San Tin near Yuen Long in Hong Kong. it is within Yuen Long District.

It is part of Deep Bay, an internationally significant wetland that is actually a shallow estuary, at the mouths of Sham Chun River, Shan Pui River (Yuen Long Creek) and Tin Shui Wai Nullah. Inner Deep Bay is listed as a Ramsar site under Ramsar Convention in 1995, and supports globally important numbers of wetland birds, which chiefly arrive in winter and during spring and autumn migrations. It provides a conservation area for mammals, reptiles, insects, and over 350 species of birds.

The reserve is managed by the World Wide Fund for Nature Hong Kong since 1983 and WWF runs professionally guided visits for the public and schools to the reserve ; the Agriculture, Fisheries and Conservation Department has responsibilities for the Ramsar site as a whole. Deep Bay faces threats, including pollution, and rising mudflat levels that perhaps arise from intense urbanization, especially (in recent years) on the north, Shenzhen side of the bay.

In recent years, it housed over 55,000 migrating birds, including Saunders's gull (Chroicocephalus saundersi) and a quarter of the world's Black-faced spoonbill (Platalea minor) population. The critically endangered Spoon-billed sandpiper (Calidris pygmaea) is recorded regularly on migration. The reserve also includes inter-tidal mangroves along with 24 traditionally operated shrimp ponds (called Gei Wai locally) to provide food for the birds. Mai Po Marshes receives some 32,000 visitors annually.

While the area was taken out of the Frontier Closed Area on 15 February 2012, Mai Po Nature Reserve remains a restricted area under the Wild Animals Protection Ordinance (Chapter 170) in order to minimize disturbance to wildlife.

Visitors need a 'Mai Po Marshes Entry Permit' to enter the Reserve. 
By joining a WWF professionally guided activity you can book online wwf.org.hk/en and be part of a small group ecovisit and WWF will take care of permits for you. 

Individuals can apply for a permit by writing to the Agriculture, Fisheries & Conservation Department of Hong Kong Government. The aforementioned Individual Permits normally take about four weeks to be processed.

38 mammal species inhabit the reserve, more than anywhere else in Hong Kong. Mai Po is home to one of the highest densities of leopard cat in the territory, however they are nocturnal and rarely seen. Small Asian mongooses are quite common in the reserve, often encountered by visitors near Gei Wai ponds during the day in winter. A small population of Eurasian otters, a locally endangered species, is found in Mai Po.

The marshes also have rich insect biodiversity, housing the endemic Mai Po bent-winged firefly (Pteroptyx maipo Ballantyne) was discovered. Not only was the species new to science, but it was also the first time for the genus Pteroptyx has been recorded in China. To understand the seasonal population changes, distribution and habitat requirements of the species, WWF Hong Kong have been carrying out firefly surveys of the nature reserve. The surveys have also incorporated Citizen Science participation, and using this approach to further monitor the biodiversity, WWF have incorporated iNaturalist and the City Nature Challenge into activities at their Mai Po centre.

Avian flu outbreak 
In February 2008, the Hong Kong government closed Mai Po for 21 days following the discovery of a great egret infected with H5N1, also known as avian flu.  The closing marked the fourth in as many years and was consistent with the government's policy of closing Mai Po whenever an infection is discovered within a 3 kilometer radius of the premises.

The World Wide Fund for Nature criticized the government, however, for what it called a discrepancy between the standards for closing Mai Po and the comparably less strict standards applied in urban areas.  The World Wide Fund for Nature wanted compensation of 1 million Hong Kong dollars. WWF then claimed that the government had not compensated it for lost income.

Education
Mai Po is in Primary One Admission (POA) School Net 74. Within the school net are multiple aided schools (operated independently but funded with government money) and one government school: Yuen Long Government Primary School (元朗官立小學).

See also
 Hong Kong Wetland Park
 Nam Sang Wai
 Fung Lok Wai
 Environment of Hong Kong
 List of buildings, sites and areas in Hong Kong

References

Further reading

External links

 Official WWF-HK Mai Po Webpage
 Birding at Mai Po Marshes
 Deep Bay wetland under threat
 Mai Po Biotope Mapping Key

Places in Hong Kong
Ramsar sites in Hong Kong
Nature conservation in Hong Kong
Nature reserves in Hong Kong
World Wide Fund for Nature
Mai Po